Daren is a hamlet bach in the  community of Trefeurig, Ceredigion, Wales, which is 73.2 miles (117.7 km) from Cardiff and 174.5 miles (280.8 km) from London. It is represented in the Senedd by Elin Jones (Plaid Cymru) and is part of the Ceredigion constituency in the House of Commons.

Daren Camp, a hillfort, lies nearby.

Daren Bank

Banc-y-Darren is a small hamlet near the town Aberystwyth in Ceredigion, Wales. There are 8 houses there, and fields and farms nearby.

References

See also
List of localities in Wales by population 

Villages in Ceredigion

cy:Banc-y-Darren